The Bishop of Roscrea was an episcopal title which took its name after the town of Roscrea in County Tipperary, Ireland.

Roscrea monastery was founded by Saint Crónán of Roscrea in the 7th century, and from which the modern town grew around it. In March 1152, the diocese of Roscrea was one of the twenty-four dioceses established at the Synod of Kells. There are only two known diocesan bishops of Roscrea: Ísác O Cuanáin who died in 1161 and Ua Cerbaill who died in 1168. By the end of the 12th century, Roscrea had been incorporated into the bishopric of Killaloe.

In 1970, the Roman Catholic Church revived the title as the Titular Bishop of Ros Cré.

Titular bishops of Ros Cré

References

Ros Cre
Roman Catholic Diocese of Killaloe
Diocese of Limerick and Killaloe
Ros Cre
Former Roman Catholic bishoprics in Ireland